Planet Hollywood International Inc.  (stylized as planet Hollywood, planet Hollywood observatory and ph) is a themed restaurant chain inspired by the popular portrayal of Hollywood. The company is owned by Earl Enterprises corporation. Earl Enterprises was founded by Robert Earl.

It was launched in New York City on October 22, 1991, with the backing of Hollywood stars Sylvester Stallone, Arnold Schwarzenegger and Bruce Willis. The actors recruited were paid for their appearances and endorsements through an employee stock ownership plan. Further celebrity endorsement included actors Demi Moore, Whoopi Goldberg, Jean-Claude Van Damme, Don Johnson, Cindy Crawford, Melanie Griffith, Tom Arnold, Wesley Snipes, and Danny Glover; director John Hughes; and comedian Roseanne Barr; and singer-songwriter Ringo Starr.

Background
Robert Earl had a history of opening theme-restaurants first in Britain (1970s) and in Orlando, Florida. In 1987, he sold this restaurant group (President Entertainments; 70 restaurants) to a larger company, Pleasurama PLC. For Pleasurama, Earl acquired control of Hard Rock Cafe International (eastern rights company) from co-founder Isaac Tigrett then in 1989 named as chief executive of the company. At the end of 1989, Mecca Leisure acquired Pleasurama. Mecca was then purchased by the Rank Organisation in 1990. While expanding Hard Rock Cafe from seven to 20 locations over the next two years, Earl met Bryan Kestner, with whom he had a shared vision of music, movies, and sports transcending language and other barriers.

History
Planet Hollywood was  opened in late 1991 in New York City, at the base of two adjacent office buildings at 130 and 140 West 57th Street. Arnold Schwarzenegger, Sylvester Stallone and Bruce Willis were some of the actors who became investors/promoters. By the next year, three more locations were opened: London,  southern California, and  Chicago. In 1993, the company opened two new locations,  Washington, D.C., and Cancun, Mexico, while arranging leases for five new locations. Each new unit, opening  with a gala event, generated nearly $15 million revenue in their first operational year.

With its success, the company continued its aggressive expansion plan in 1994 while turning its attention to developing more theme-restaurant concepts, one of which was the Official All Star Café, a sports version of Planet Hollywood. Given the go ahead, they started recruiting professional sports figures and planning its stadium and home cuisine menu and planning its merchandise.

The brand's highest-grossing location unit was opened in Las Vegas in 1994 with double the usual seating to 500. This was followed later in the year by another 500-seater at Walt Disney World.

With expansion operating smoothly, Earl started working on other area of growth in 1995. Construction on the All Star Café's first location in New York City began in August 1995 near the Planet Hollywood and opened on December 18, 1995. Development was started on a Marvel Comics-based restaurant concept and on a Planet Hollywood Squares television game show with King World and Roseanne Barr's production company based on the Hollywood Squares. With the success of the merchandise, stand alone retail stores, Planet Hollywood Superstores were opened around 1996.

Public corporation
As of the May 1998 IPO circular, the celebrities were only minor holders of stock with Earl and Barish owning 57.2 percent and a 24.2 percent stake owned by Ong Beng Seng. In April 1996, Planet Hollywood went public on the New York Stock Exchange at $18 a share.  The company's share price reached an all-time high of $32 on the first day of trading; by 1999, it was down to less than $1. The company has gone bankrupt twice. In addition to going public, the company had MBNA issue Planet Hollywood VISA credit cards that gave cardholders priority restaurant seating. Planet Hollywood International and ITT Corporation formed a joint venture for Planet Hollywood casinos. The corporation and Marvel Entertainment Group agreed to launch the Marvel Mania comic book character-based restaurant concept. The company also had started to develop Chefs of the World concept, which would feature a "'star-studded' culinary staff".

The company planned to expand by 30 to 40 percent each year in annual revenue and the number of restaurant locations. Additional competitors also started up, including Country Star chain, Harley-Davidson Café, Robert De Niro's Tribeca Grill and Thunder Roadhouse. Some speculated that the company had thinned its resources too much, and, with the trend of novelty location visits dropping, store revenue would continue to drop.

In September 1997, Planet Hollywood International Inc. announced its Cool Planet Cafe ice-cream shop chain which would open 10 locations in 1998. ITT Corporation and Planet Hollywood were in discussion early September 1997 for a Planet Hollywood hotel near Times Square. The corporation then formed on September 24, 1997, a joint venture for an Official All Star Hotel.

In the fourth quarter of 1997, the company recorded a $40 million loss. Too much focus on diversification showed that the original chain was neglected with mediocre food, high menu prices and below normal service. In early November 1998, Barish resigned as board chairman while retaining his board director post and filing to sell some of his company's stock. Earl replaced him as chairman. Barish was replaced by William Baumhauer as president. The franchise in Cape Town, South Africa,  had a bomb attack in August 1998. $244 million in losses were recorded in 1998.

The first Marvel Mania opened in January 1998 near Universal Studios Hollywood. With MTV Networks, Planet Hollywood opened its first Sound Republic in London in mid-1998. In July 1999, the company started its Planet Movies by AMC. In August 1998, the first Cool Planet Cafe opened in  Santa Monica, California.

In March 1999, Barish resigned as board director and sold shares that week. At a May, 1999, shareholder's annual meeting, the company indicated that a delayed-payment agreement was in negotiation and that they were renovating some and are considering closing other outlets.

Causing little change on the company's net profit/loss line, Baumhauer resigned in June, 1999, with the company having $359 million in debt on the books to return to his previous employer, Unique Casual Restaurants. By July, 1999, Planet Hollywood had sold its Orlando HQ for cash and leased it back for 15 years. On October 12, 1999, the company filed for Chapter 11 bankruptcy in an attempt to reorganize. They closed or sold poorly performing Planet Hollywood restaurants and Official All Star Cafes. It moved to focus to its original theme concept, stopping operation of Planet Movies by AMC and sold its Sound Republic units.

Schwarzenegger severed his financial ties with the business in January, 2000. Planet Hollywood exited Chapter 11 bankruptcy on May 9, 2000, with the approval of its reorganization plan. New celebrities were sought out for their restaurants while renewing relationships with early recruits. The plan included capital and debt restructuring including a cash infusion plus new products and improvements to decor and the menu. Planet's first website was launched with entertainment news and chat rooms. Earl, Prince Al-Waleed bin Talal and Ong Beng Seng had led restructuring plan which left the company with 35 locations, 25 of which were franchised.

Barred due to its bankruptcy, Planet Hollywood International had relisted in May 2000 on the NASDAQ.
In September, 2000, the Official All Star Cafe in Times Square was closed with the Planet Hollywood taking over its 600-seat location. While this All Star location was profitable, Planet Hollywood was more profitable. The company was also coming out of Chapter 11 bankruptcy.

In October, 2001, Planet Hollywood International filed again for Chapter 11 bankruptcy. Blaming the economic slowdown from the September 11 attacks, the company had $135 million in debt.

In July, 2010, Earl hired a CEO and president, David Crabtree, for Planet Hollywood and its parent company from Westgate Resorts. Planet Hollywood Resorts International, LLC signed on Wyndham Hotel Group to develop franchises for Planet Hollywood Resorts in September, 2010.

In April 2022, Planet Hollywood announced plans to offer more than 60,000 of its memorabilia, including photographs and movie posters, as NFTs under MetaHollywood.

Buca di Beppo
In September 2008, Planet Hollywood International Inc. acquired Buca, Inc., the owner of the Buca di Beppo national restaurant chain.

Planet Hollywood bombing 

In August 1998, the Planet Hollywood restaurant in Cape Town, South Africa, was the target of a terrorist bombing killing two people. The perpetrators of the bombing stated it was in retaliation for American air-raids conducted in Sudan and Afghanistan.

Locations

, following the closure of several dozen locations, there are six restaurants and five hotels operating:

Restaurants with merchandise stores
Las Vegas - The Forum Shops at Caesars (opened July 1994)
Los Angeles International Airport - Tom Bradley International Terminal (opened November 2016)
Walt Disney World - Disney Springs (opened October 1994; renovation to Planet Hollywood Observatory, opened 2017)
Bay Street Entertainment Complex - St. Julian's, Malta (opened June 2019)
Doha Oasis, Msheireb - Doha, Qatar (opened 2 September 2021) 
New York City - Times Square (opening fall 2022)

Resorts
Goa - Planet Hollywood Goa, Utorda Beach (opened October 2014)
Las Vegas - Planet Hollywood Resort & Casino, Las Vegas Strip (opened April 2007)
Costa Rica - Planet Hollywood Beach Resort Costa Rica, Peninsula Papagayo (opened October 2018)
Cancun - Planet Hollywood Resort Cancun (opened January 29, 2021)
St. Maarten - (opening March 2022)

Former other concepts
 Official All Star Café (1995—2007)
 Chefs of the World - The company also had started to develop this concept around 1996, which would feature a "'star-studded' culinary staff".
 Marvel Mania restaurant  (1998—1999) is a Marvel Comics themed restaurant planned to be expanded into a chain. The corporation and Marvel Entertainment Group agreed in 1996 to launch the Marvel Mania comic book character-based restaurant concept. The joint venture had an option on Times Square Theater for a location that expired in December 1996. The first location opened in January 1998 near Universal Studios Hollywood with Marvel being a co-owner with Universal Studios Hollywood  and Planet Hollywood. However, Planet Hollywood had financial problems due to expanding too quickly and had to close it.
 Planet Movies by AMC (July 1999—) movie multiplexes of 30 screens maximum in complexes with Planet Hollywood and All Star Cafe restaurants and Cool Planet ice cream parlors In May 1998, the corporation agreed to its first United Kingdom location for Planet Movies by AMC in Manchester.
Planet Hollywood Resort and Casino in Las Vegas had its grand opening the weekend of November 16, 2007, in the remodeled Aladdin Hotel & Casino. Planet Hollywood partnered with Westgate Resorts on the new Planet Hollywood Resort & Casino, connected to the existing resort, which opened on January 1, 2010. The building is a key subject in the documentary film The Queen of Versailles. The resort and casino were sold in 2010 to Caesars Entertainment, and the separate Towers project was sold to Centerbridge Partners' Resort Finance Associates in 2011.
 Sound Republic was a music-theme restaurant chain in a joint venture with MTV Networks. Some location would have concert halls (four out of six) and there would be recruit music celebrities. Sound Republic was announced by Planet Hollywood International on June 8, 1998, with plans to open six locations over two years with the first in London mid-1998. In the third quarter 1998, the second location was to open in New York City. London and New York City would have halls with 600 to 800-seat and 1,200- to 1,400-seat respectively.  Of the next four, a location was slated for its join venture hotel-casino in Las Vegas but none for Orlando.

Cool Planet Cafe

Cool Planet Cafe  is a joint venture chain of ice cream shops owned by Planet Hollywood International with a movie theme. Host Marriott Services is partnering on developing an additional 10 locations in a joint venture with Planet Hollywood.

Cool Planet Ice Cream, which was launched with its ice cream shops, was made by Dreyer's and was available in grocery stores with flavors like Blue Berry-More and Die-Hard Chocolate.

Planet Hollywood International founded the Cool Planet Cafe in September 1997 with the announcement of Whoopi Goldberg from the Planet Hollywood's star stable as the main promoter of the chain; its private label Cool Planet Ice Cream and planned to open 10 Cool Planets in 1998. The company then partnered with Marriott Services Corp. for the cafes in June 1998 with plans to open nine locations where Marriott already has operations with no locations finalized. Termi-Nutter sundaes was mentioned as being part of the menu.

In August 1998, the first Cool Planet Cafe opened in the Third Street Promenade retail district of Santa Monica, California. At that time, the Host Marriott joint venture had scheduled five locations to be opened by July 1999 and two more by December 1999. Cool Planet branding is still used in the dessert section of the menus of Planet Hollywood restaurants.

See also
 Bubba Gump Shrimp Company
 Buca di Beppo
 Rainforest Cafe
 Fashion Cafe
 Hard Rock Cafe

References

External links

Corporate home page
Interviews from the opening of Planet Hollywood's San Antonio location, Texas Archive of the Moving Image

Gambling companies established in 1991
Restaurants established in 1991
Restaurant franchises
Gambling companies of the United States
Restaurant chains in the United States
Film-themed restaurants
Coffeehouses and cafés in the United States
Sylvester Stallone
Arnold Schwarzenegger
Bruce Willis
1991 establishments in New York City
Companies that filed for Chapter 11 bankruptcy in 1999
Companies that filed for Chapter 11 bankruptcy in 2001
Theatres
Auditoriums